Georgios "Giorgos" Diamantopoulos (born on February 15, 1980) is a Greek former professional basketball player. At a height of 6'5" (1.96 m) tall, he played as a shooting guard-small forward. In the prime of his career, he possessed great scoring ability.

Professional career
In the 2001–02 season, Diamantopoulos led the European-wide 2nd-tier level FIBA Saporta Cup in scoring, averaging 22.6 points per game. In the 2002–03 season, he was the Greek League Top Scorer, while playing for Panionios. He was also a player of the Greek League clubs Papagou and Olympiacos Piraeus. He was also a member of the Italian League club Roseto Basket, and the Spanish Second Division club La Palma.

In the 2006–07 season, Diamantopoulos won the FIBA EuroCup Challenge championship, while playing with the Russian Super League club CSK VSS Samara. He then played with the NBA Summer League squad of the NBA club the Indiana Pacers. During the 2007–08 season, he was a member of Kolossos.

He joined Maroussi for the 2008–09 season. He moved to the Cypriot League club Achilleas in 2010, and then to the Swiss League Vacallo Basket in 2012. He also played with the Cypriot club Keravnos in 2012. He joined Doxa Lefkadas in 2013. He returned to Panionios in 2014. In 2015, he moved to Papagou, and to Ermionis in 2016. He retired from playing professional basketball in 2017.

National team career
Diamantopoulos was a member of both the Under-16 and Under-18 junior Greek national basketball teams. He won the bronze medal with Greece at the 1998 FIBA Europe Under-18 Championship. With Greece's national junior teams, he also played at the 1999 FIBA Under-19 World Cup.

He was also a member of the senior men's Greek national basketball team.

Awards and accomplishments

Clubs
3× Greek League All-Star: (2001, 2002, 2003)
FIBA Saporta Cup Top Scorer: (2002)
Greek All-Star Game MVP: (2003)
Greek League Top Scorer: (2003)
FIBA EuroCup Challenge Champion: (2007)

Greek junior national team
1998 FIBA Europe Under-18 Championship:

References

External links 
NBA.com Profile
Euroleague.net Profile
FIBA Profile
FIBA Europe Profile
Eurobasket.com Profile
Greek League Profile 
Italian League Profile  
Draftexpress.com Profile
The Draft Review Profile

1980 births
Living people
Achilleas Kaimakli players
BC Samara players
Doxa Lefkadas B.C. players
Greek men's basketball players
Greek Basket League players
Keravnos B.C. players
Kolossos Rodou B.C. players
Maroussi B.C. players
Olympiacos B.C. players
Panionios B.C. players
Papagou B.C. players
Roseto Sharks players
SAV Vacallo Basket players
Shooting guards
Small forwards
UB La Palma players
Basketball players from Athens